The United States Navy Band, based at the Washington Navy Yard in Washington, D.C., has served as the official musical organization of the U.S. Navy since 1925. The U.S. Navy Band serves the ceremonial needs at the seat of government, performing at presidential inaugurations, state arrival ceremonies, state funerals, state dinners, and other significant events.

The band performs all styles of music – from ceremonial pieces such as "ruffles and flourishes" to classical, rock, jazz and country hits.

Organization and personnel

Since its official designation in 1925, the United States Navy Band has grown into a diverse organization of multiple performing units. The organization features six performing ensembles: the Concert Band, the Ceremonial Band, the Commodores jazz ensemble, Country Current country-bluegrass ensemble, the Cruisers contemporary entertainment ensemble, and the Sea Chanters chorus. There are also several chamber music groups. The multiple ensembles help meet the public demand for different types of music and the needs of Navy recruiting.

The United States Navy Band is composed of 172 enlisted musicians and four officers, under the direction of Capt. Kenneth Collins.

Concert Band
The Concert Band is the Navy's premier wind ensemble. Along with the Ceremonial Band, this band was part of the original Navy Band in 1925. The group plays concerts in the Washington, D.C. area and performs a month-long national tour each year.

Ceremonial Band
The Ceremonial Band performs ceremonies in and around the Washington, D.C. area. Their primary mission is performing for funerals at Arlington National Cemetery. Additionally, the Ceremonial Band performs at command changes, retirements, patriotic openers, wreath-layings, and arrivals.

Sea Chanters

In 1956, Lt. Harold Fultz, then the band's assistant leader, organized a Navy School of Music group to sing chanteys and patriotic songs for the State of the Nation dinner. An immediate success, ADM Arleigh Burke, then chief of naval operations, transferred them to the Navy Band, named them the Sea Chanters, and tasked this all-male chorus with perpetuating the songs of the sea. In 1980, the group added women to their ranks and expanded their repertoire to include everything from Brahms to Broadway.

Commodores
Founded in 1969, the Commodores are a jazz ensemble. Performers who have appeared with the group include Ray Charles, Stanley Turrentine, Louie Bellson, Terry Gibbs, Chris Potter, Jerry Bergonzi, Bob Mintzer, Dave Leibman, James Moody, and Clark Terry.

Country Current
This seven-member group was formed in 1973 and specialized in country and bluegrass music.

Cruisers
A contemporary entertainment ensemble with eight members was formed in 1999.

History

Early music in the Navy
The earliest music of the United States Navy was the shantyman's song. These melodies of the sea helped soften the rigors of shipboard life. Next came trumpeters, drummers, and fifers who were carried on the early frigates to sound calls, give general orders, and perform at funerals and other ceremonies. Military bands became a separate section of the crew on many Navy vessels.

The development of shore-based bands in the 19th century led to the creation of the Naval Academy Band, which grew in size and importance during the American Civil War. Other band units afloat and ashore played a significant role in promoting sailors' and civilians' morale.

At the start of World War I, many musicians left their orchestras to join the United States Navy, using their talents to further the war effort.

Establishment of the U.S. Navy Band
In 1916, a 16-piece band from the battleship  was ordered to the Washington Navy Yard to augment a 17-piece band aboard the Presidential Yacht . The new unit became known as the "Washington Navy Yard Band" and was given rehearsal space near the power plant's coal pile. The increasing tempo of the band's duties led the bandmaster to seek more suitable quarters in the yard's "Sail Loft", and sailmakers were soon cutting and stitching their canvas to the rhythms of the music. The United States Navy Band still occupies the Sail Loft as its headquarters and rehearsal hall.

In 1923, a 35-man contingent from the Navy Yard Band accompanied President Warren G. Harding on his trip to the Alaska Territory. After the president's unexpected death in San Francisco, the band performed the hymn "Nearer My God to Thee" as his body was placed aboard a train destined for Washington, D.C.

With the band growing in importance and prestige, President Calvin Coolidge signed into law a 1925 bill stating "hereafter the band now stationed at the Navy Yard, known as the Navy Yard Band, shall be designated as the United States Navy Band." The legislation also allowed the band to take its first national tour in 1925.

Among those praising the early United States Navy Band was the Boston Post newspaper, which printed on 13 March 1929: "…Some folks have an idea perhaps that Navy music is made up of a few chantey choruses, a jig, and "The Star-Spangled Banner". To the average American Citizen the performance last night must have been a truly startling eye-opener. They performed like a company of first-rank virtuosi…"

Under the baton of Lt. Charles Benter, the band's first leader, the United States Navy Band was featured at many historic occasions, including the 1927 return of Charles Lindbergh following his trans-Atlantic flight. Two years later, the band performed for the return of Adm. Richard E. Byrd from his famous South Pole flight.

The need for qualified musicians led Lt. Benter to found the Navy School of Music under his charge in 1935. Many of the faculty were bandsmen who taught in addition to their performance duties.

Throughout much of the 1960s, the band's leader was Anthony A. Mitchell, a classical clarinetist and accomplished composer who had joined the band in 1937. During his tenure as the Band's director LCDR Mitchell composed the popular march Our Nation's Capital, later honored as the official march of Washington, D.C. He also wrote a march for the yet-unbuilt National Cultural Center in Washington, D.C. The National Cultural Center March was first performed and recorded by the band in 1963 and was performed at fundraising events for the Center throughout the early 1960s. In 1964 the center was renamed the Kennedy Center for the Performing Arts to honor the fallen president. The march's title was changed to the John F. Kennedy Center March in 1964, though it is still often referred to by its original title.

Crash

On 25 February 1960, 19 members of the Navy Band were flying from Buenos Aires to Rio de Janeiro to join the rest of the band at a reception for President Dwight D. Eisenhower and Brazilian President Juscelino Kubitschek. As the Navy transport plane approached Rio de Janeiro in a dense fog, it collided in mid-air with a Brazilian airliner above the city's harbor, not far from the landmark Sugarloaf Mountain. Among the 61 people killed were 19 members of the Navy Band, including the assistant leader, J. Harold Fultz, and most of the string section. Three U.S. sailors playing cards at the back of the airplane were the only survivors. The crash was the single worst event in the band's history and devastated the remaining members of the band. Despite their losses, the surviving musicians completed their South American tour.

Capitol concerts
Among the Navy Band's many accomplishments were weekly Monday night concerts, and smaller daily concerts held at the U.S. Capitol. Held on a special stage located on the east side of the Capitol, the daily and weekly concerts ran without interruption from the 1930s until the early 1970s.
In the 1960s, the Navy Band began a series of popular children's performances, known as "Lollypop Concerts".

Past leaders of the Navy Band

Radio performances
From 1929 to 1939, the United States Navy Band took to the airwaves with Arthur Godfrey on NBC's "Hour of Memories" radio program. During World War II, the United States Navy Band supported the sale of war bonds. It assisted in national recruiting efforts, although most of the band's time was spent performing at the daily funerals at Arlington National Cemetery.

At the close of the war in 1945, the radio program "The Navy Hour" was born. It featured such entertainers as Lt. Robert Taylor and Lt.(j.g.) Gene Kelly, with whom the band had appeared in the film Anchors Aweigh. When it went off the air in 1968, "The Navy Hour" had set a record for one of the longest tenures in radio.

Other notable performances

The United States Navy Band has performed at the following ceremonies and events:
 1927 – Washington ceremony for Charles Lindbergh.
 1929 – Washington ceremony for Adm. Richard E. Byrd
 1962 – Washington, D.C. ceremony for astronaut John Glenn.
 1963 – Funeral parade and funeral for President John F. Kennedy.
 1966 – First performance by the Navy Band at New York City's Carnegie Hall
 1981 – Return of the hostages during the Iran Hostage Crisis
 1993 – Re-dedication of the Statue of Freedom and the Bicentennial of the United States Capitol
 1995 – Dedication parade of the Korean War Veterans Memorial
 1997 – Dedication of the Women in Military Service for America Memorial at Arlington National Cemetery and the Franklin Delano Roosevelt Memorial Ceremony of Dedication
 1998 – Re-dedication of the Wright Brothers National Memorial in Kill Devil Hills, North Carolina
 1999 – Veterans of Foreign Wars 100th Anniversary celebration at their national convention in Kansas City, Missouri
 2000 – International Naval Review festivities in New York City
 2001 – "United in Memory" memorial service at the Pentagon
 2002 – "Beam of Hope" remembrance ceremony at Freedom Plaza in Washington, D.C.

Discography of the U.S. Navy Band
 1963 – The National Cultural Center Presents the United States Navy Band, RCA Victor
 1992 – Music for Honors and Ceremonies
 1996 – Commemoration
 1997 – Ports of Call
 1997 – That Holiday Feeling
 1998 – Seawolf
 1998 – Coast to Coast II
 1999 – Mystic Chords of Memory
 2000 – American Salute
 2000 – 75th Anniversary Collection
 2001 – Celebrations
 2002 – Music for Chamber Winds
 2002 – Happy Holidays
 2003 – Overtures and Finales
 2005 – Light Cavalry Overture...and other Warhorses
 2006 – Sail Loft Sounds
 2006 – World Class Marches
 2007 – Holiday Wishes
 2009 – Command Performance
 2009 – Directions
 2011 – Derivations
 2022 – Premieres

Notable members 
 Victor Salvi, Italian-American harpist, played with the band during World War II, and later with the New York Philharmonic and the NBC Symphony Orchestra, before founding Salvi Harps.

Music

Gallery

See also
Fleet Band Activities
Musician (United States Navy)
United States Armed Forces School of Music
United States military bands
United States Naval Academy Band
United States Navy Steel Band

References

This article incorporates public domain text from a U.S. federal government website.

External links 

Wind bands
Musical groups established in 1925
Bands of the United States Navy
Ceremonial units of the United States military
1925 establishments in the United States
Washington Navy Yard